Cong Yanxia (born 20 February 1976) is a Chinese handball player. She competed in the women's tournament at the 1996 Summer Olympics.

References

1976 births
Living people
Chinese female handball players
Olympic handball players of China
Handball players at the 1996 Summer Olympics
Place of birth missing (living people)
Asian Games medalists in handball
Handball players at the 1994 Asian Games
Asian Games bronze medalists for China
Medalists at the 1994 Asian Games